League tables for teams participating in Ykkönen, the second tier of the Finnish Soccer League system, in 1996.

League tables

Etelälohko

Pohjoislohko

Promotion play-offs

HIK Hanko–TP-Seinäjoki 2–5
TP-Seinäjoki–HIK Hanko 3–0

TP Seinäjoki won 8–2 on aggregate and proceeded to the next round

HIK Hanko–HJK Helsinki 0–1
HJK Helsinki–HIK Hanko 1–1

HJK won 2–1 on aggregate and remained in the Veikkausliiga.

See also
Veikkausliiga (Tier 1)
1996 Finnish Cup

References

Ykkönen seasons
2
Finland
Finland